List of neighbourhoods in the City of Gatineau, Quebec, Canada.

Aylmer Sector

 Centre-Ville (Downtown) Aylmer
 Champlain Park
 Deschênes
 Glenwood
 Lakeview Terrace
 Le Plateau (adjacent to Hull Sector)
 Les Cedres
 Lucerne Nord
 Manoir Champlain/Rivermead
 McLeod/Eardley/Lakeview Terrace
 Parc Aylmer
 Pilon
 Queen's Park
 Seigneurie Lavigne/Jardins Lavigne
 Vieux Moulin
 Wychwood/Des Pionniers

Hull Sector

 Des Hautes-Plaines 
 Manoir des Trembles
 Lac des Fées (Wrightville)
 Le Plateau (adjacent to Aylmer sector)
 Mont-Bleu
 Parc de la Montagne
 Richelieu Industrial Park
 Saint-Jean-Bosco (Wrightville)
 Saint-Raymond (Parc de la Montagne)
 Val-Tétreau
 Jardins Taché (Val-Tétreau)
 Vieux-Hull/Downtown (Île de Hull)
 Wrightville

Gatineau sector

 Achbar
 Baie McLaurin
 Bellevue/Davidson
 Centre-Ville (downtown) Gatineau
 Coteville
 De la Sablonnière/Cheval Blanc
 De l'Hôpital
 Des Érables
 Du Ruisseau
 La Baie
 Le Baron
 Le Carrefour
 Les Hauteurs
 Les Pins
 Le Versant
 Limbour/Côte d'Azur
 Lorrain
 McLaren
 Mont-Luc
 Mont-Royal/Côte des Neiges
 Notre-Dame/Saint-Jean Marie Vianney
 Paiement
 Pointe-Gatineau
 Riviera/Touraine
 Sainte-Rose
 Saint-René
 Saint-Richard
 Tecumseh
 Terrasses-Paiement/Ravins-Boises
 Touraine

Masson-Angers sector

 Angers
 Masson

Buckingham sector

 Buckingham East
 Buckingham West

History of Gatineau

Gatineau